The 2014 Nollywood Movies Awards was held on October 18, 2014 at Intercontinental Hotel, Lagos.

Awards
Winners are in bold.
 Best Movie
A Mile From Home
Confusion Na Wa
Itoro
Make a Move
Unforgivable
False
Flower Girl
Brother’s Keeper
 Best Lead Male
Mike Ezuruonye (Unforgivable)
OC Ukeje (Confusion Na Wa)
Tope Tedela (A Mile From Home)
Kalu Ikeagwu (False)
Blossom Chukwujekwu (Finding Mercy)
Frederick Leonard (The Accident)
Gbenga Akinnagbe (Render to Caesar)
Yul Edochie (Chioma The Weeping Queen)
 Best Lead Female
Ireti Doyle (Torn)
Nse Ikpe-Etim Sule (I Come Lagos)
Chioma Akpotha (The Accident)
Mercy Johnson (Hustlers)
Dayo Amusa (Unforgivable)
Joke Silva (The Visitor)
Uche Jombo-Rodriguez (False)
Damilola Adegbite (Flower Girl)
 Best Actor (Supporting Role)
Lucky Ejim (Render To Caesar)
Ikponmwosa Gold (Confusion Na Wa)
Keppy Ekpeyong-Bassey (Itoro)
Wale Adebayo (Make A Move)
Okey Uzoeshi (Lonely Heart)
Wale Macaulay (The Accident)
 Best Actress (Supporting Role)
Emem Udonquak (Itoro)
Abiola Segun-Williams (Finding Mercy)
Clarion Chukwura Abiola (Hustlers)
Ebele Okaro Onyiuke (Leave My Tears)
Bikiya Graham-Douglas (Flower Girl)
Daniella Okeke (Lagos Cougars)
 Best Actor Indigenous
Afeez Eniola (Alakada)
Okey Bakassi (Onye Ozi)
Bayo Alawiye (Atanda)
Odunlade Adekola (Mufu Olosha)
 Best Actress Indigenous
Dayo Amusa (Unforgivable)
Queen Nwokoye (Ada Mbano)
Ngozi Igwebike (Onye Ozi)
Toyin Aimakhu Johnson (Alakada)
Rita Edward (Misfit)
 Best Indigenous Movie
Onye Ozi
Alakada 2
Misfit
Ada Mbano
Unforgivable
Atanda
 Best Director
Confusion Na Wa (Kenneth Gyang)
A Mile From Home (Eric Aghimien)
Itoro (Moses Inwang)
False (Ike Nnaebue)
Flower Girl (Michelle Bello)
Torn (Moses Inwang)
Render To Caesar (Desmond Ovbiagele)
Unforgivable (Desmond Elliot)
 Best Editing
Flower Girl (Kunle Laguda)
Render To Caesar (Steve Sodiya)
False (Ike Nnaebue)
Itoro (Moses Inwang)
Brother’s Keeper (Okey Benson And  Okey Oku)
The Accident (Not Specified)
 Best Sound Design
Flower Girl (Kunle Laguda)
Secret Room (Maurice Kings)
Kidnap (Not Specified)
Render To Caesar (Michael Ogunlade)
Lagos Cougars (Owolabi Gbade)
 Best Cinematography
Confusion Na Wa (Yinka Edward)
Render To Caesar (Johnny Askwith)
A Mile From Home (Eric Aghimien)
False (Joseph Oladunjoye)
Misplaced (Tom Robson/ Dickson Godwin)
Flower Girl (James Costello)
 Best Original Screenplay
Render To Caesar (Desmond Ovbiagele)
A Mile From Home (Not Specified)
False (Ike Nnaebue / Foluke Amanfo)
Finding Mercy (Kehinde Olorunyomi-Odukoya)
Accident (Not Specified)
Unforgivable (Jovi Babs & Olamilekan Daniels)
 Best Costume Design
The Village Boy I Love (Ogoo Okechi And Doris Kalu)
False (Ngozi Jombo – Divas And Divos)
After The Proposal (Ngozi Jombo)
A Mile From Home (Godwin Aghimien)
Lagos Cougars (Angel Nwakibie)
 Best Makeup
Honeymoon Hotel (Madeline Viijeon / Geordi Binstend / Kirsty Williams / Israel Moses)
A Mile From Home (Not Specified)
Brother’s Keeper (Mathew Alechenu)
False (Chichi Okafor – Faceville)
Unforgivable (Abiolah Makeup World)
 Best Set Design
Flower Girl (Derick Nwa-Jesus)
A Mile From Home (Eric Aghimien And Biodun Olagbaju)
Lonely Heart (Not Specified)
Dream Walker (Not Specified)
False (Ujay Studio)
Itoro (Not Specified)
Best Soundtrack
Flower Girl (Efya – Best In Me)
A Mile From Home (Vincent Umukoro)
False (Don L37)
Render To Caesar (Michael Ogunlade and Seun Owoaje)
Atanda (Pius Fatoke)
Unforgivable – Izuchukwu Anozie Vincent
 Best Diaspora Movie
Onye Ozi
Labo
Shameful Deceit
 Best Short Movie
Brave
Date Gone Bad
Desolation
Not Right
New Horizon
Kabu Kabu
Best Rising Star Male
Tope Tedela (A Mile From Home)
Blossom Chuks Chukwujekwu (Finding Mercy)
Okey Uzoeshi (Lonely Hearts)
Alexx Ekubo (Lagos Cougars)
Lucky Ejim (Render To Caesar)
Shawn Faqua (Lagos Cougars)
 Best Rising Star Female
Ivie Okujaye (Make A Move)
Lilian Esoro (Secret Room)
Lala Akindoju (Alan Poza)
Daniella Okeke (Lagos Cougars)
Tamara Eteimo (Finding Mercy)
Dabota Lawson (Finding Mercy)
Emem Udonquak (Itoro)
Best Child Actor
Oyindamola Lapejo – Finding Mercy
Helger Sosthenes – Make A Move
Tobe Oboli – Brother’s Keeper
Titilayo Shobo – Unforgivable
NMA Lifetime Achievement Award 2014
Tunde Kelani
 Best TV/Web series
Tinsel
Humanity Award
Stella Ameyo Adadevo

Popular Choice Awards
Popular Choice Female- Mercy Johnson
Popular Choice Male- Odulade Adekola
Top Box Office movie- Weekend Getaway

References

Nigerian film awards